Chauliognathus marginatus, known generally as the margined leatherwing or margined soldier beetle, is a species of soldier beetle in the family Cantharidae. It is found in Central America and North America.

References

Further reading

External links

 

Cantharidae
Articles created by Qbugbot
Beetles described in 1775
Taxa named by Johan Christian Fabricius